OmniPop is a program used to class populations by autosomal DNA results. It is a Microsoft Excel file and requires Excel to run. The program is recognized and used by NIST for the purpose of clustering autosomal markers and is also suggested by commercial genealogical genetics companies to their customers for use in understanding their results.

References

External links
Download OmniPop version 200.1
NIST page linking to current version of OmniPop
Download OmniPop version 150.5
Download page for other .xls DNA programs - Several Y-chromosomal STR age predictor programs 

Population genetics
Genetic genealogy
Spreadsheet software